Harkemase Boys is a football club from Harkema, Netherlands. The club plays in the Derde Divisie since 2016, when it won a section championship in the Hoofdklasse.

History 
On 27 October 2021, they became one of 3 Derde Divisie teams to advance to the 2021–22 KNVB Cup second round, as they beat VV DOVO 2–1 thanks to an extra time goal from Arnoud Bentum.

References

External links
Official website 
Highlights of a match against VV Capelle

Harkemase Boys
Football clubs in the Netherlands
Association football clubs established in 1946
1946 establishments in the Netherlands
Football clubs in Achtkarspelen